The Slovak Athletic Federation (Slovak Slovenský atletický zväz) is the governing body for the sport of athletics in Slovakia.

Affiliations 
International Association of Athletics Federations (IAAF)
European Athletic Association (EAA)
Slovak Olympic Committee

National records 
SAZ maintains the Slovak records in athletics.

External links 
Official webpage

Slovakia
Athletics
National governing bodies for athletics